Audrain County is a county located in the central part of the U.S. state of Missouri. As of the 2020 census, the population was 24,962. Its county seat is Mexico. The county was organized December 13, 1836, and named for Colonel James Hunter Audrain of the War of 1812 and who later was elected to the state legislature.

History
Audrain county was formed from a non-county area with portions under the administration of Montgomery, Callaway, Boone, Ralls, or Monroe counties at various times prior to its official establishment in 1836. Thus, records for locations now in Audrain prior to 1836 may indicate location in those counties instead. Some details have been summarized on the website of the Northeast Missouri Genealogy Village, and a dynamic map showing some of the changes is on the 'mapgeeks' website showing historical maps of the states of the United States. (See 'External Links' below.)

Today's Audrain County historical website data (see 'External Links' below) indicates that the county was divided about 50/50 during the historic US Civil War and that US Army Commander General Ulysses Grant was resident there briefly during that time.  While Audrain county shared some history with neighboring counties, it does not border the Missouri River.

According to some Confederate historian publications, Audrain County was one of several nearby counties settled by migrants from the Upper South, especially Kentucky and Tennessee; that some brought slaves and slaveholding traditions with them, cultivating crops similar to those in Middle Tennessee and Kentucky such as hemp and tobacco, or brought antebellum architecture and culture; and that the county was considered by those historians to be in the heart of what was called "Little Dixie".

Geography

Adjacent counties
Monroe County  (north)
Ralls County  (northeast)
Pike County  (east)
Montgomery County  (southeast)
Callaway County  (south)
Boone County  (southwest)
Randolph County  (northwest)

Major highways
 U.S. Route 54
 U.S. Route 54 Business
 Route 15
 Route 19
 Route 22
 Route 151

Demographics

Audrain County comprises the Mexico, MO Micropolitan Statistical Area, which is included in the Columbia-Moberly-Mexico, MO Combined Statistical Area.

As of the census of 2010, there were 25,529 people, 9,844 households, and 6,762 families residing in the county.  The population density was 37 people per square mile (14/km2).  There were 10,881 housing units at an average density of 16 per square mile (6/km2). 89.8% of the population were White, 6.4% Black or African American, 0.5% Asian, 0.4% Native American, 1.2% of some other race and 1.7% of two or more races.  2.6% were Hispanic or Latino (of any race). 33.2% were of German, 16.0% American, 9.3% Irish and 8.4% English ancestry.

There were 9,844 households, out of which 31.40% had children under the age of 18 living with them, 55.20% were married couples living together, 9.90% had a female householder with no husband present, and 31.30% were non-families. 27.80% of all households were made up of individuals, and 13.40% had someone living alone who was 65 years of age or older.  The average household size was 2.43 and the average family size was 2.96.

In the county, the population was spread out, with 24.60% under the age of 18, 7.90% from 18 to 24, 28.20% from 25 to 44, 22.50% from 45 to 64, and 16.90% who were 65 years of age or older.  The median age was 38 years. For every 100 females there were 84.20 males.  For every 100 females age 18 and over, there were 78.70 males.

The median income for a household in the county was $32,057, and the median income for a family was $40,448. Males had a median income of $28,550 versus $20,712 for females. The per capita income for the county was $16,441.  About 11.10% of families and 14.80% of the population were below the poverty line, including 23.30% of those under age 18 and 9.80% of those age 65 or over.

Religion
According to the Association of Religion Data Archives County Membership Report (2010), Audrain County is sometimes regarded as being on the northern edge of the Bible Belt, with evangelical Protestantism being the most predominant religion. The most predominant denominations among residents in Audrain County who adhere to a religion are Southern Baptists (36.07%), Roman Catholics (12.55%), and Christian Churches and Churches of Christ (8.09%).

2020 census

Government and infrastructure

Audrain County E-911 Joint Communications
Audrain County Joint Communications is the primary public safety answering point (PSAP) for Audrain County, and is responsible for handling incoming and outgoing communication from the public for assistance from law enforcement, fire, and medical personnel throughout Audrain County. Joint Communications is specifically responsible for receiving incoming 9-1-1 emergency telephone calls, and dispatching the appropriate personnel; receiving other non-emergency telephone calls and dispatching, routing, or messaging those calls to the correct personnel; entering information into, and inquiring information from the Missouri Uniform Law Enforcement System (MULES) and the National Crime Information Center (NCIC) crime databases; maintaining a detailed computerized log of requests received and dispatched; and keeping current on city and county geography, so that members may assist responding personnel in locating addresses.

Staff includes 7 full-time Dispatchers, 2 part-time Dispatchers, 3 full-time Shift Supervisors, the Assistant 911 Director, and the 911 Director. There is a minimum of two Dispatchers on duty at all times to answer incoming and outgoing communications.

Upgrades to the communications equipment and computer software were made when Mexico Public Safety Dispatch and Audrain County Sheriff's Dispatch consolidated to form the Joint Communications Center in October 1999. These upgrades allowed for even better service to the county. At that time the Vandalia Police Department elected to continue to operate their communications center for the Vandalia Police Department, Vandalia Fire District, and Van-Far Ambulance District. Audrain County Joint Communications and Vandalia Communications acted as backup sites for each other, so if anything happened to one center there would be no disruption of service to the residents and visitors of Audrain County.

In February 2007, Joint Communications implemented an Emergency Medical Dispatch (EMD) program utilizing the protocol-based Medical Priority Dispatch System created by the National Academies of Emergency Dispatch. This program allows dispatchers to quickly and accurately determine the nature of an emergency medical call and prioritize it to allow for the most appropriate response. Joint Communications's dispatchers are trained to provide real-time instruction of CPR and other life-saving first aid while simultaneously dispatching Emergency Medical Service (EMS) professionals to the emergency. This reduces the time between the onset of symptoms and when basic aid is provided to the patient, thus increasing the patient's chances of survival in life-threatening emergencies.

Another equipment upgrade was completed in March 2007. This upgrade included new 9-1-1 equipment and a new telephone and radio voice recorder. These upgrades were necessary to keep current with the latest technology available. With the new 9-1-1 system dispatchers have quicker access to a caller's telephone and address data and it introduced a mapping system to automatically plot emergency calls on a map, allowing for a faster response by emergency personnel as dispatchers previously had to look up addresses on the map manually. The new 9-1-1 system also allows for upgrades to accommodate future telephone and communications technologies. The previous 9-1-1 system was unable to process telephone number and location information from cellular telephone calls, which created a problem in determining the location of an emergency if the caller is unable to speak. The new 9-1-1 system is compatible with cellular telephone and Voice over Internet Protocol (VoIP) technologies, and these services will be added to the Audrain County E-911 system as they become available.

On February 15, 2008, Audrain County Joint Communications assumed the communications responsibilities for the Vandalia Police Department, Vandalia Fire District and Van-Far Ambulance District. Ralls County E-911 was designated as the backup PSAP for Audrain County Joint Communications so if anything were to happen to the Joint Communications Center there would be no disruption of service to the residents and visitors of Audrain County.

In August 2008, Joint Communications Director Chris Hardin began the process of implementing Phase II wireless service to the Audrain County E-911 system. This process was expected to take several months, but after Phase II wireless service was implemented Joint Communications would be able to locate a caller when they called 911 from a cellular telephone.

Joint Communications became Wireless Phase II with AT&T Mobility (formerly Cingular Wireless) on March 3, 2009, and with US Cellular on March 16, 2009. The other cellular phone providers were expected to follow shortly.

Joint Communications became Wireless Phase II with Sprint Nextel on July 15, 2009, meaning that Joint Communications is now Wireless Phase II with all of the cellular phone providers officially serving Audrain County.

Emergency medical services
Audrain Ambulance District
Van-Far Ambulance District

Fire services
Farber Fire Department
Laddonia Fire Department
Little Dixie Fire Protection District
Martinsburg Fire Department
Mexico Public Safety Department
Vandalia Fire Department

Law enforcement
Audrain County Sheriff's Office
Farber Police Department
Martinsburg Police Department
Mexico Public Safety Department
Vandalia Police Department

Prison
The Women's Eastern Reception, Diagnostic and Correctional Center, a women's prison of the Missouri Department of Corrections, is located in Vandalia and in Audrain County.

Education

Public schools
Community R-VI School District – Laddonia 
Community Elementary School (PK-05) 
Community High School (06-12)
Mexico School District No. 59 – Mexico 
McMillan Early Learning Center (PK-K) 
Hawthorne Elementary School (K-05) 
Eugene Field Elementary School (K-05) 
Mexico Middle School (06-08) 
Mexico High School (09-12)
Van-Far R-I School District – Vandalia 
Van-Far Elementary School (PK-06) 
Van-Far High School (07-12)

Private schools
Sunnydale Seventh-day Adventist Elementary School – Centralia (02-09) – Seventh-day Adventist
St. Brendan School – Mexico (PK-08) – Roman Catholic
St. Joseph Elementary School – Martinsburg (K-09) – Roman Catholic
Missouri Military Academy – Mexico (07-12)

Public libraries
 Mexico-Audrain County Library District

Politics

Local
Politics are divided at the local level in Audrain County. Republicans hold a majority of the elected positions in the county.

State

All of Audrain County is currently included in Missouri's 43rd Legislative District and is currently represented by Kent Haden (R-Mexico) in the Missouri House of Representatives.

All of Audrain County is a part of Missouri's 10th District in the Missouri Senate and is currently represented by Jeanie Riddle (R-Mokane).

Federal
Most of Audrain County is included in Missouri's 4th Congressional District and is currently represented by Vicky Hartzler (R-Harrisonville) in the U.S. House of Representatives. Communities in Audrain County included in the 4th District include Mexico. Hartzler was elected to a sixth term in 2020 over Democratic challenger Lindsey Simmons.

Some of Audrain County is included in Missouri's 6th Congressional District and is currently represented by Sam Graves (R-Tarkio) in the U.S. House of Representatives. Communities in Audrain County included in the 6th District include Farber, Laddonia, and Vandalia. Graves was elected to an eleventh term in 2020 over Democratic challenger Gena Ross.

Audrain County, along with the rest of the state of Missouri, is represented in the U.S. Senate by Josh Hawley (R-Columbia) and Roy Blunt (R-Strafford).

Blunt was elected to a second term in 2016 over then-Missouri Secretary of State Jason Kander.

Political culture

At the presidential level, Audrain County has become solidly Republican in recent years. Audrain County strongly favored Donald Trump in both 2016 and 2020. Bill Clinton was the last Democratic presidential nominee to carry Audrain County in 1996 with a plurality of the vote, and a Democrat hasn't won majority support from the county's voters in a presidential election since Michael Dukakis in 1988.

Like most rural areas throughout Missouri, voters in Audrain County generally adhere to socially and culturally conservative principles which tend to influence their Republican leanings, at least on the state and national levels. Despite Audrain County's longstanding tradition of supporting socially conservative platforms, voters in the county have a penchant for advancing populist causes. In 2018, Missourians voted on a proposition (Proposition A) concerning right to work, the outcome of which ultimately reversed the right to work legislation passed in the state the previous year. 63.40% of Audrain County voters cast their ballots to overturn the law.

Missouri presidential preference primaries

2020
The 2020 presidential primaries for both the Democratic and Republican parties were held in Missouri on March 10. On the Democratic side, former Vice President Joe Biden (D-Delaware) both won statewide and carried Audrain County by a wide margin. Biden went on to defeat President Donald Trump in the general election.

Incumbent President Donald Trump (R-Florida) faced a primary challenge from former Massachusetts Governor Bill Weld, but won both Audrain County and statewide by large margins.

2016
The 2016 presidential primaries for both the Republican and Democratic parties were held in Missouri on March 15. Businessman Donald Trump (R-New York) narrowly won the state overall, but Senator Ted Cruz (R-Texas) carried a plurality of the vote in Audrain County. Trump went on to win the nomination and the presidency.

On the Democratic side, former Secretary of State Hillary Clinton (D-New York) both won statewide and carried Audrain County by a small margin.

2012
The 2012 Missouri Republican Presidential Primary's results were nonbinding on the state's national convention delegates. Voters in Audrain County supported former U.S. Senator Rick Santorum (R-Pennsylvania), who finished first in the state at large, but eventually lost the nomination to former Governor Mitt Romney (R-Massachusetts). Delegates to the congressional district and state conventions were chosen at a county caucus, which selected a delegation favoring Santorum. Incumbent President Barack Obama easily won the Missouri Democratic Primary and renomination. He defeated Romney in the general election.

2008
In 2008, the Missouri Republican Presidential Primary was closely contested, with Senator John McCain (R-Arizona) prevailing and eventually winning the nomination.

Then-Senator Hillary Clinton (D-New York) received more votes than any candidate from either party in Audrain County during the 2008 presidential primary. Despite initial reports that Clinton had won Missouri, Barack Obama (D-Illinois), also a Senator at the time, narrowly defeated her statewide and later became that year's Democratic nominee, going on to win the presidency.

Communities

Cities
Centralia (mostly in Boone County)
Farber
Laddonia
Mexico (county seat)
Vandalia

Villages
Benton City
Martinsburg
Rush Hill
Vandiver

Unincorporated communities

 Champ
 Hollensville
 Molino
 Rowena
 Saling
 Skinner
 Thompson
 Tulip
 Worcester

Townships
Audrain County is divided into eight townships:

 Cuivre
 Linn
 Loutre
 Prairie
 Saling
 Salt River
 South Fork
 Wilson

Notable people
Tom Bass, horse trainer
Cookie Belcher, former professional basketball player
Howard L. Bickley, Chief Justice of New Mexico
Kit Bond - U.S. Senator (R-Missouri) (1987-2011) and Governor of Missouri (1973-1977 & 1981–1985)
Jason Brookins, former NFL running back with the Baltimore Ravens
Pendleton Dudley, journalist and public relations
Charles Henry Hardin - Governor of Missouri (1875-1877) and co-founder of Beta Theta Pi fraternity
Anna J. Harrison - First female president of the American Chemical Society
Edward D. "Ted" Jones, broker
Howard Kindig, former Super Bowl winning NFL player
Tyronn Lue, head coach of the Los Angeles Clippers and former NBA player
Adolph John Paschang, Roman Catholic bishop
Prim Siripipat, television anchor
Lebbeus R. Wilfley, federal judge
Xenophon P. Wilfley, U.S. Senator (D-Missouri) (1918-1918)

See also

National Register of Historic Places listings in Audrain County, Missouri

References

External links
 Dynamic map of history of Missouri counties, including the formation of Audrain County in 1836.
 Northeast Missouri Genealogical Village website: includes history of adjacent Missouri counties prior to, and relating to, the official formation of Audrain County.
 History of Audrain County per county website.
 Audrain County Area Genealogical Society website.
 Audrain County's website
 Audrain County E-911 Joint Communications website
 Audrain County Sheriff's Office website
 Digitized 1930 Plat Book of Audrain County  from University of Missouri Division of Special Collections, Archives, and Rare Books
 Audrain County Historical Society

 
1836 establishments in Missouri
Populated places established in 1836
Missouri counties
Little Dixie (Missouri)
Columbia metropolitan area (Missouri)